Anoush (also Anush) is a five-act opera composed by Armen Tigranian, based on the 1892 poem of the same name by Hovhannes Tumanyan. Originally composed in 1912, it was first performed in Alexandropol, but it had to wait until 1935 for its full professional staging at the Armenian National Opera Theater. Anoush remains in the repertoire in Armenia.

The opera has special importance to Armenian musical history as one of its most significant accomplishments. Being a work of national character, Anoush was the first opera truly inspired by Armenian folk music and culture, and it is perhaps the most popular Armenian musical and theatrical work.

The opera is about the tragedy of a peasant girl (Anoush) whose short love affair ends in loss and death because of conflict between her lover (Saro) and her brother (Mossy).

Plot 
The tragic love story is set in a typical 19th century Armenian village. Anoush is a young village girl who falls in love with a shepherd, named Saro. One evening, at a village wedding celebration, Mossy, Anoush's brother, and Saro wrestle in a friendly match. Anoush watched from the sidelines. However, instead of ending it in a draw, as is the prevailing custom, Saro violates the local code of honor and humiliates him by pinning him down. Enraged, Mossy vows to destroy Saro, whom he now considers his enemy. Efforts for reconciliation between the two failing, and finding their hopes of marriage dashed, Anoush and Saro run away. Eventually, while Anoush is back in the village in an attempt for reconciliation, Mossy finds Saro and shoots him dead. Upon this loss, Anoush loses her sanity and ends her life by throwing herself off a cliff.

Recordings
Anoush - Kohar Kasparian (Anoush soprano), Dikran Levonian (Saro tenor), Arshavir Garabedian (Mosi baritone).  Armenian National Opera Theatre, choir conductor Roupen Aivazian, orchestra conductor Hagop Vosganian, 2CD 1998
Mosi's aria - on Arias of Love & Sorrow Gevorg Hakobyan (baritone), Kaunas Symphony Orchestra, John Fisher, Constantine Orbelian 2023

See also
Armenian opera

References 
Opera: Anoush, Classic of Armenia, in Detroit by John Rockwell, The New York Times, 2 November 1981

External links
 "Опера Тиграняна «Ануш»" [Tigranyan's opera Anoush] by А. Гозенпуд, details, belcanto.ru (in Russian)

, Gohar Gasparyan as Anoush

1912 operas
Operas
Armenian-language operas
Operas by Armen Tigranian
Operas based on literature